Carlo Bassi (1807, in Amsterdam – 1856, in Milan) was an Italian entomologist.

He was honorary curator of entomology in the Museo Civico di Storia Naturale di Milan from 1841 to his death in 1856. He was a specialist in Coleoptera.

Bassi wrote "Description du genre Malacogaster" in  Guérin-Méneville's Magasin de Zoologie, d'Anatomie com- parée et de Paleontologie 1833 and in the 1834 issue of Annales de la Société Entomologique de France) he erected the carabid genus Cardiomera.
 
His collection and extensive library of works on Coleoptera is conserved in the Museo Civico di Storia Naturale di Milan.

References
 Amedeo Benedetti, La Biblioteca del Museo di storia naturale di Milano, Biblioteche Oggi, Milano, Ed. Bibliografica, n. 5, giugno 2005.

Italian entomologists
1807 births
1856 deaths